Jahesh Tarabar Qom BC is an Iranian professional basketball club. The club competes in the Iranian Super League.

References

External links
Asia-Basket.com Team Page

Basketball teams in Iran